Weekend of Shadows is a 1978 film directed by Tom Jeffrey and starring John Waters.

Premise
In the 1930s, a farmer's wife in a small town is murdered. Suspicion falls on a Polish labourer and a posse is formed to catch him.

Cast
John Waters as 'Rabbit'
Melissa Jaffer as Vi
Wyn Roberts as Sergeant Caxton
Graham Rouse as Ab Nolan
Graeme Blundell as Bernie Collins
Bill Hunter as Bosun
Bryan Brown as Bennett

Production
Writer Peter Yeldham later called the film a "real disaster... we had constant changes and insecurity about it, right up to the day of shooting. I think many of these changes didn't help the film."

Shooting commenced in July 1977 in Macclesfield in the Adelaide Hills. The film was a commercial disappointment. Director Tom Jeffrey: I screened the film to Hugh Atkinson, the writer of the novel, after we had finished it and he came up to me afterwards and I remember him saying quite clearly, "You've got it." I said, "What do you mean?" He said, "You understand the ending." And I still didn't know whether I had it right, whether I was on his wavelength, and I said, "Please explain, Hugh." And he said, "It's about the Crucifixion." And I said, "Yes, well, I didn't really realise that, but if you can see that in the ending and if that's what your original intention was and I've unwittingly achieved that for you, I'm very pleased.".. The film was actually looking at the power of the group and how it can get out of hand.

References

External links

Weekend of Shadows at Oz Movies

1978 films
Australian crime drama films
Films set in the 1930s
Films set in Australia
1970s English-language films
Films directed by Tom Jeffrey
1970s Australian films